Just Married is a 2007 Bollywood film directed by Meghna Gulzar and starring Fardeen Khan, Esha Deol in lead roles along with Satish Shah, Kirron Kher and Mukul Dev in supporting roles.

Plot 
Abhay Sachdeva and Ritika Khanna are young, modern Indian professionals. They briefly meet at a wedding, and individually make their dislike for arranged marriages known, since they do not understand the concept of marrying a stranger. Unbeknownst to them, their parents meet at the same wedding and compare their horoscopes, which begins the process of arranging a match. Even though they each have strong objections, the couple eventually give in to their parents' wishes and get married. The newlyweds then embark on a honeymoon trip to Ooty. The trip is part of a romantic getaway package where they will be sharing a lodge with other couples.

The first people they meet are Mr and Mrs Chaturvedi, an elderly couple celebrating their anniversary. They constantly bicker and argue, but actually love each other deeply. Abhay and Ritika then meet Shoaib and Anaiya, another newlywed couple. Anaiya is Shoaib's sister's best friend and has always had feelings for him, but Shoaib is unable to think of Anaiya as anything but a childhood friend. Strolling in the forest, the pair meet Rishab and Anu, a couple who are head over heels in love with each other and have come to Ooty on their yearly holiday. They have the perfect romance and the other couples envy them and their amazing relationship. Later, Ritika tries to prolong dinner to avoid spending time alone with Abhay. That night she can't bring herself to  consummate the marriage, and after Abhay falls asleep she decides to sleep on the sofa. The next day, the group prepares to go on an outing organised by the lodge management. There they meet A.K. and Sarah, who have arrived late due to delayed trains. A.K. is an explorer who has been out of the country for a long time, and Sarah is his long-term, half-Indian girlfriend. A.K. has proposed many times but Sarah does not see the need for marriage.

The couples spend the day exploring the lake and surrounding town. Later, at a celebratory dinner organised for Mr and Mrs Chaturvedi's fortieth anniversary, the group gets better acquainted by sharing the stories of how each couple met. That night Abhay separates the beds in their room so Ritika does not feel uncomfortable any longer. He explains to her that they need to work on their relationship for it to grow; she is still reluctant but her attitude begins to soften. The next day the pair spend time alone, visiting tourist attractions and getting to know each other. The romantic, happy mood is broken that night when Abhay tries to be intimate with Ritika and she lashes out at him, causing an argument. Their relationship is strained but she puts on a show for the other couples, who all believe that they are adjusting to their arranged marriage well. A few days later, a frustrated Abhay expresses his conflicted feelings towards love and marriage, and Mr Chaturvedi gives the men some advice. Meanwhile, the women give Sarah a traditional Indian makeover as a surprise for A.K. He proposes and she accepts, and the other couples plan them a celebration.

At the party Shoaib is finally able to see Anaiya as his wife, and they decide to have dinner alone together. Sarah notices the tension between Abhay and Ritika and advises Ritika to work things out before the issue escalates. The celebrations are cut short when an employee informs Rishab that his wife has called to speak to him, and the group realizes that Anu and Rishab are having an affair. An emotional Anu decides to leave Rishab and the lodge that night. The next day, the group departs from the lodge as the trip comes to an end. The bus has an accident and hangs off the edge of a cliff. Abhay makes a plan to get all the passengers off the bus, but a scared Mr and Mrs Chaturvedi refuse to leave. Ritika gets on board again to convince them to get off, and the frightening situation brings her closer to Abhay.

As everyone else waits for alternative transport, Abhay and Ritika decide to start afresh, and walk towards the direction of the lodge to begin their honeymoon once again.

Cast 
 Fardeen Khan as Abhay Sachdeva
 Esha Deol as Ritika Khanna Sachdeva (Ritu)
 Bikram Saluja as Rishabh
 Perizaad Zorabian as Ananya 'Anu'
 Eijaz Khan as Deepak, Abhay's friend
 Anita Hassanandani as Amrita, Ritika's friend
 Kirron Kher as Shobha Chaturvedi
 Satish Shah as Mr. Chaturvedi
 Raj Zutshi as Arjun Kohli/A.K.
 Tarina Patel as Sarah
 Mukul Dev as Shoaib Mirza
 Sadiya Siddiqui as Anaiya Mirza
 Lubna Salim as Nandini Sachdeva, Abhay's sister
 Kiran Karmarkar as Rohit, Abhay's brother-in-law

Music

References

External links
 

2007 films
2000s Hindi-language films
Films shot in Ooty
Films featuring songs by Pritam
Films about marriage
Films about Indian weddings